Casey Newton is an American technology journalist, a former senior editor at The Verge, and the founder and editor of a technology newsletter called Platformer.

Career 
Newton had been covering the Arizona State Legislature for The Arizona Republic, with an interest in technology as a hobby. Kristin Go, a former coworker at The Arizona Republic, invited him to work at the San Francisco Chronicle to cover tech companies and new technology, which Newton accepted. He worked as a blogger and senior writer for CNET until 2013. Afterward, between 2013 and 2020, he covered Silicon Valley at The Verge and became a senior editor. In addition, he authored a daily newsletter called The Interface, which had grown to 20,000 subscribers. In 2020, he left to create his own newsletter on Substack called Platformer. Newton and a few other newsletter writers established a Discord server for all of their subscribers. Then, in late 2022, he began a technology news podcast for the New York Times, called Hard Fork, co-hosting with Kevin Roose.

He has been independently described by Roose as having "opinions [that] hold sway among social media executives".

His reporting on the effects of content moderation on workers (resulting in PTSD) has led to a contracting company cutting ties with Facebook.

Personal life 
Casey Newton was born on June 19, 1980. Newton is gay. He graduated from Northwestern University in 2002 with a Bachelor of Journalism. He lives in San Francisco.

References

External links 
 
 

1980 births
American male journalists
American technology journalists
CNET
American LGBT journalists
Living people
Medill School of Journalism alumni
San Francisco Chronicle people
The Verge